Carl Harbord (26 January 1908 – 18 October 1958) was an English stage, film and television actor.

Stage
When he was 19, Harbord appeared in the play The Happy Husband, which was presented at the Criterion Theatre in London, England. In 1933, he first appeared in a play in Australia. His first Broadway appearance was in 1934, in a production of Noël Coward's Conversation Piece at the 44th Street Theatre.

Film
Harbord entered the film industry during the final stage of the silent era. He appeared in several early sound films for British International Pictures such as The Informer. One of his most prominent roles was in Anthony Asquith's First World War film Tell England. Harbord later went to Hollywood where he played supporting, but sometimes significant minor roles.

Partial filmography

 Bolibar (1928) - Lt. Gunther
 Young Woodley (1928) - Ainger
 The American Prisoner (1929) - Lt. Burnham
 The Informer (1929) - Francis McPhillip
 The Hate Ship (1929) - Arthur Wardell
 An Obvious Situation (1930) - Michael Turner
 Such Is the Law (1930) - Vivian Fairfax
 Tell England (1931) - Edgar Doe
 Fascination (1931) - Larry Maitland
 Dance Pretty Lady (1931) - Maurice Avery
 Strictly Business (1931) - David Plummett
 She Was Only a Village Maiden (1933) - Peter
 The Mystery of Mr. X (1934) - Constable (uncredited)
 The Scarlet Pimpernel (1934) - Member of the League (uncredited)
 18 Minutes (1935) - Jacques
 Heart's Desire (1936) - Oliver Desmond
 Love at Sea (1935) - Dick
 The Cavalier of the Streets (1937) - Prince Karanov
 Captains of the Clouds (1942) - Blake
 Eagle Squadron (1942) - Lubbock
 London Blackout Murders (1943) - George Sandleigh
 Background to Danger (1943) - Minor Role (uncredited)
 Sahara (1943) - Marty Williams
 Dressed to Kill (1946) - Inspector Hopkins
 The Macomber Affair (1947) - Coroner
 Bulldog Drummond Strikes Back (1947) - Inspector Sanderson
 Christmas Eve (1947) - Dr. Doremus
 A Woman's Vengeance (1948) - Leslie Blake
 Rope of Sand (1949) - Perseus Club Manager (uncredited)

References

Bibliography
 Kelly, Andrew. Cinema and the Great War. Routledge, 1997.

External links

1908 births
1958 deaths
Male actors from Devon
English male stage actors
English male film actors
English male television actors
20th-century English male actors